The action of 6 December 1782 was an naval encounter primarily fought between  and the  off the coast of Martinique.  Ruby easily defeated Solitaire.

Background
By the end of 1782 the Spanish and French had been on the defensive since the Battle of the Saintes, which signaled British domination of the seas in the Caribbean. Soon after, the Royal Navy were conducting a blockade off Cap-François and Fort-Royal as well as keeping a watch off Havana.

Action
The Royal Navy squadron of Rear Admiral Richard Hughes on 6 December 1782 sighted a French squadron off Martinique. The 64-gun , captained by John Collins, sailed towards the 1,521-ton  of 64 guns, under the command of Jean-Charles de Borda. Collins eventually caught up with Solitaire and a single-ship action developed. After nearly forty minutes Solitaire had her mizzenmast shot away, her rigging and sails in tatters, and was becoming dead in the water. At that point Borda decided to strike her colours.

In the action the British also captured the French brig , which defended herself vigorously at the cost of heavy casualties, including the death of her captain.

Solitaire had 35 men killed and 55 wounded whilst Ruby had only two men wounded.

Aftermath
Collins was knighted for his action. Solitaire entered the Royal Navy as HMS Solitaire and remained in service until 1790, when she was sold out of the navy. Jean-Charles de Borda, although captured along with his entire crew, was shortly released and returned as an engineer in the French Navy. He later achieved fame as a mathematician, physicist and political scientist.

Citations and references 
Citations

References
 
 

Conflicts in 1782
Naval battles involving France
Naval battles involving Great Britain
Naval battles of the Anglo-French War (1778–1783)
1782 in the Caribbean